María del Rocío García Gaytán (21 October 1959 – 3 April 2015) was a Mexican politician from the National Action Party. From 1997 to 2000 she served as Deputy of the LVII Legislature of the Mexican Congress representing Jalisco. She also served as Director of the National Institute of Women (Inmujeres) during Felipe Calderón's government. She died on 3 April 2015 due to cancer.

References

1959 births
2015 deaths
Politicians from Guadalajara, Jalisco
Women members of the Chamber of Deputies (Mexico)
National Action Party (Mexico) politicians
Deaths from cancer in Mexico
Members of the Chamber of Deputies (Mexico) for Jalisco